Heera may refer to:

 Heera (given name) (includes a list of people with the name)
 Heera (film), an Indian film
 Al Heera, a locality in the United Arab Emirates
 Heera Group UK, a music group
 Heera Group (India), a fraudulent investment company
 Heera Dom, Bhojpuri Poet

See also 
 
 Heer (disambiguation)
 Hera (disambiguation)
 Hira (disambiguation)